Norman Webster (20 May 1896 – 11 January 1967) was a Canadian cyclist. He competed in five events at the 1920 Summer Olympics.

References

External links
 

1896 births
1967 deaths
Canadian male cyclists
Olympic cyclists of Canada
Cyclists from Ontario
Cyclists at the 1920 Summer Olympics
Sportspeople from Markham, Ontario